Yves Benoit Bationo (born 27 December 1993) is a professional footballer who most recently played as a midfielder for Italian club Portici. Born in Ivory Coast, he represents the Burkina Faso national team at international level.

Career
Born in N'Guinou, Bationo was a Parma player, but didn't make his debut for the side; instead he was on loan with a number of clubs, namely, Empoli (Serie B), Perugia (with no appearances), Gorica (Slovenian First League), Nîmes II (Championnat de France amateur 2) and San Marino Calcio (Lega Pro). He was bought by Tuttocuoio on a free transfer, after his contract ran out with Parma.

In January 2016, he was loaned to Savona.

On 23 August 2019, it was confirmed on Lega Serie A's official website, had Bationo had been registered for Hellas Verona from Casertana. However, he was loaned out to Albanian club Flamurtari Vlorë the following day to restart his career after three years without playing any official games.

On 15 April 2021, he joined Italian fourth-tier Serie D club Portici.

References

External links
 
 

1993 births
Living people
Citizens of Burkina Faso through descent
Burkinabé footballers
Burkina Faso international footballers
Association football midfielders
Parma Calcio 1913 players
Empoli F.C. players
ND Gorica players
Slovenian PrvaLiga players
Nîmes Olympique players
A.S.D. Victor San Marino players
Hellas Verona F.C. players
Flamurtari Vlorë players
A.C. Tuttocuoio 1957 San Miniato players
Serie B players
Serie C players
Championnat National 3 players
Ivorian people of Burkinabé descent
Sportspeople of Burkinabé descent
People from Lacs District
Burkinabé expatriate footballers
Expatriate footballers in Slovenia
Expatriate footballers in France
Burkinabé expatriate sportspeople in France
Expatriate footballers in Italy
Burkinabé expatriate sportspeople in Italy
Expatriate footballers in Albania
21st-century Burkinabé people